Robert Thompson Bush (14 January 1839 – 24 December 1874) was an English first-class cricketer active 1864–68 who played for Surrey. He was born and died in Kennington.

References

1839 births
1874 deaths
English cricketers
Surrey cricketers